General elections were held in Jordan on 21 October 1956. The National Socialist Party emerged as the largest party, with 12 seats.

The elections were considered to be one of the most free in Jordan's history, and was the first and only election to produce an elected government. Hizb ut-Tahrir, which won a single seat, was later banned.

Results

See also
Suleiman Nabulsi's cabinet

References

Elections in Jordan
General election
Jordan
Election and referendum articles with incomplete results
Jordan